The Keuper is a lithostratigraphic unit (a sequence of rock strata) in the subsurface of large parts of west and central Europe. The Keuper consists of dolomite, shales or claystones and evaporites that were deposited during the Middle and Late Triassic epochs (about ). The Keuper lies on top of the Muschelkalk and under the predominantly Lower Jurassic Lias or other Early Jurassic strata.

The Keuper together with the Muschelkalk and the Buntsandstein form the Germanic Trias Group, a characteristic sequence of rock strata that gave the Triassic its name.

Exposure
The Upper Triassic is well exposed in Swabia, Franconia, Alsace and Lorraine and Luxembourg; it extends from Basel on the east side of the Rhine into Hanover, and through England into Scotland and north-east Ireland; it appears flanking the central plateau of France and in the Pyrenees and Sardinia.  The Keuper sequence is linked by name to the Keuper Uplands area of southern Germany.

In south Sweden, the lower portion contains coal-bearing strata, as in the Himalayas, Japan, Tibet, Burma, eastern Siberia and in Spitsbergen. The upper portion of the Karoo Supergroup of South Africa and part of the Otapiri stage of New Zealand are probably of Rhaetian age.

Germany
In Germany and adjacent parts of western and central Europe, the Keuper unit is divided into three groups:
Upper Keuper
The upper part of this division is often a grey dolomite known as the Grenz dolomite; the impure coal beds Lettenkohle are aggregated towards the base. The sandstones are used for building purposes at Bayreuth, Culmbach and Bamberg. In Swabia and the Wesergebirge are several bone-beds, thicker than those in the middle Keuper, which contain a rich assemblage of fossil remains of fish, reptiles and the mammalian teeth of Microlestes antiquus and Triglyptzas Fraasi. The name "Rhaetic" is derived from the Rhaetic Alps where the beds are well developed; they occur also in central France, the Pyrenees and England. In South Tirol and the Judicarian Mountains, the Rhaetic is represented by the Kossenei beds. In the Alpine region, the presence of coral beds gives rise to the so-called Lithodendron Kalk.
Hauptkeuper or Gipskeuper, the middle
 The middle division is thicker than either of the others (at Göttingen); it consists of a marly series below, grey, red and green marls, with gypsum and dolomite—this is the gypskeuper in its restricted sense. The higher part of the series is sandy, hence called the Steinmergel; it is comparatively free from gypsum. To this division belong the Myophoria beds (M. Raibliana) with galena in places; the Estheria beds (E. laxilesta); the Schelfsandstein, used as a building-stone; the Lehrherg and Berg-gyps beds; Semionotus beds (S. Bergen) with building-stone of Coburg; and the Burgand Stubensandstein.
Kohlenkeuper, Unterkeuper or Lettenkohle, the lower
The lower division consists mainly of grey clays and schieferletten with white, grey and brightly colored sandstone and dolomitic limestone.

The salt, which is associated with gypsum, is exploited in south Germany at Dreuze, Pettoncourt, as well as in Vie in the Lorraine region of France. A 4-metre (13 ft) coal is found on this horizon in the Erzgebirge on the border between Germany and the Czech Republic, and another, 2 metres thick (7 ft), has been mined in Upper Silesia, now in Poland.

Great Britain
In Great Britain the 'Keuper' is no longer a formally recognised geological division. The one-time Keuper Marls are now redesignated as the Mercia Mudstone Group. The underlying Keuper Sandstone is now the Helsby Sandstone Formation at the top of the Sherwood Sandstone Group.
Traditionally it contained the following subdivisions:
Rhaetic or Penarth
Grey, red and green marls, black shales, and so-called white. Upper Keuper marl, red and grey marls and shales with rock salt, . As in Germany, there are one or more bone beds in the English Rhaetic with a similar assemblage of fossils.
Lower Keuper
Sandstone, marls and thin sandstones at the top, red and white sandstones (including the so-called waterstones) below, with breccias and conglomerates at the base, .
Basal conglomerate
A shore or scree breccia derived from local materials; it is well developed in the Mendip district.

The Keuper covers a large area in the Midlands and around the flanks of the Pennine range; it reaches southward to the east Devon coast, northeastward into Yorkshire and northwestward into Northern Ireland and southernmost Scotland.

Fossils
The Keuper is not rich in fossils; the principal plants are cypresslike conifers (Walchia, Voltzia) and a few calamites with such forms as Equisetum arenaceum and Pterophyllum jaegeri. Avicula contorta, Protocardium rhaeticum, Terebratula gregaria, Myophoria costata, M. goldfassi, Lingula tenuessima, and Anoplophoria lettica may be mentioned among the invertebrates. The fish include Ceratodus, Hybodus and Lepidotus.

Labyrinthodonts represented by the footprints of Cheirotherium and the bones of Mastodonsaurus (originally called Labyrinthodon) and Capitosaurus. Among the reptiles are Hyperodapedon, Palaeosaurus, Zanclodon, Nothosaurus, Henodus and Belodon. The first fossil mammals also make their appearance at this time and the early beetle Triamyxa is also known from the Keuper.

Notes

References

Triassic System of Europe
Lithostratigraphy
Lithostratigraphy of Germany
Stratigraphy of Europe